James Edmundson Raine (3 March 1886 – 4 September 1928) was an English sportsman. He played football as an amateur outside right for Glossop, Sunderland, Newcastle United and Sheffield United in the Football League. He also played rugby union for Percy Park and minor counties cricket for Northumberland.

Raine won 10 caps for England Amateurs between 1906 and 1910, scoring eight goals. He was also part of the Great Britain squad at the 1908 Summer Olympics, but did not make an appearance.

Personal life 
Raine attended Sheffield University and worked for a manufacturing company in Derwenthaugh. His brother was a reserve team footballer for Newcastle United. Raine served as a major in the Durham Light Infantry during the First World War.

Career statistics

Club

International goals
England Amateurs score listed first, score column indicates score after each Raine goal.

References 

1886 births
1928 deaths
People from Winlaton
Footballers from Tyne and Wear
Footballers from County Durham
English footballers
English cricketers
English rugby union players
Alumni of Sheffield Hallam University
Association football outside forwards
Sheffield United F.C. players
Newcastle United F.C. players
Sunderland A.F.C. players
Reading F.C. players
Glossop North End A.F.C. players
Pilgrims F.C. players
English Football League players
Southern Football League players
England amateur international footballers
English cricketers of 1890 to 1918
Northumberland cricketers
British Army personnel of World War I
Durham Light Infantry officers
English expatriates in Switzerland
Rugby union players from Gateshead